The Professionals Guild is a pro-democracy parliamentary group in the Legislative Council of Hong Kong formed in 2016.

Overview
The Professionals Guild in Hong Kong was formed in 2016 by six pro-democracy functional constituency legislators after the 2016 Legislative Council election, which saw the pro-democrats increased their seats in the professional sectors. It held seven seats in the legislature at its peak with Dennis Kwok of the Legal constituency, Kenneth Leung of  Accountancy, Charles Mok of  Information Technology, Edward Yiu of Architectural, Surveying, Planning and Landscape, Ip Kin-yuen of Education, Shiu Ka-chun of Social Welfare and Joseph Lee of Health Services. It became one of the four pro-democracy parliamentary groups in the Legislative Council, the others being the Democratic Party, Civic Party and Council Front formed by directly elected pro-democracy individuals.

One of the major tasks of the group was coordinating the pro-democracy "Democrats 300+" election campaign in the 2016 Election Committee Subsector elections. The victory in the Legislative Council functional constituencies in the 2016 election encouraged the pro-democrats to take a more progressive strategy in the professional sector, in which the pro-democrats traditionally had more advantages.

Dennis Kwok  and Kenneth Leung were dismissed from the LegCo on 11 November 2020, following the Standing Committee of the National People's Congress decision that LegCo Members should be disqualified if they support Hong Kong independence, refuse to acknowledge China's sovereignty, ask foreign forces to interfere in the city's affairs or in other ways threaten national security. Kwok and Leung were amongst 4 LegCo members who were dismissed; all are considered moderates and have never publicly supported Hong Kong independence. Dennis Kwok said "If observing due process and fighting for democracy can lead to being disqualified, it [disqualification] will be my honour," Following this 15 other pro-democracy LegCo members have resigned.

Legco representatives
No representative in the LegCo after all of its members resigned on 12 November 2020.

See also
 Professional Commons
 Professional Forum

External links
 Professionals Guild's facebook page

References

2016 establishments in Hong Kong
Liberal parties in Hong Kong
Political parties established in 2016